On September 20, 2009, elections were held for all 251 seats in the General Synod of the Church of Sweden. Since the 1930s, nominating groups have often been directly affiliated with national political parties, but many groups are now established separately from political parties.

Results

References 

Church of Sweden
Christian church elections
Chuch
2009 in Christianity
Sweden